"Do The Clam" is a pop song recorded by Elvis Presley for his 1965 feature film Girl Happy. It was written by Sid Wayne, Ben Weisman, and Dolores Fuller.

Chart History
Do The Clam was released worldwide as a single by RCA Victor, reaching no. 21 on Billboard in the United States, no. 15 on the Record World chart, no. 16 in Canada and the American Cashbox charts, and no. 19 in the UK. It was very successful in Australia, where it reached no. 4 on the charts. It has appeared on six compilation albums of Elvis Presley's recordings.

Co-writer Dolores Fuller was a songwriter and actress who had played the role as the title character's girlfriend in Ed Wood's 1953 surrealist film, Glen or Glenda.

The song was copyrighted on February 4, 1965, and published by Gladys Music, Inc.

The B side of the 1965 single release was "You'll Be Gone", written by Red West, Elvis Presley, and Charlie Hodge in 1962. The B side reached no. 121 on Billboard and no. 35 on the Canadian charts. Both songs were on the Girl Happy soundtrack album."You'll Be Gone" was an attempt to create the same kind of song as Begin the Beguine after Elvis Presley's Management Team failed to obtain the rights to cover the song. "You'll Be Gone" is one of the songs for which Elvis Presley got a co-writer credit. (Another Elvis Presley composition is "That's Someone You Never Forget", written with Red West in 1961.)

Cover Versions
The song was featured on the 1965 album Teen Beat Discotheque by Living Guitars. The Cramps covered the song in their 1987 album Rockin n Reelin in Auckland New Zealand. In 1991 the song was spoofed by Dread Zeppelin in their song "Do The Claw".

Sources 
 Jorgensen, Ernst. Elvis Presley, A Life In Music. New York: St. Martin's Press, 1998; 
 Jorgensen, Ernst. Elvis by the Presleys. Liner Notes. BMG Heritage, 2005.
 Presley, Priscilla. Elvis by the Presleys. Liner Notes. BMG Heritage, 2005.
 Hopkins, Jerry. Elvis: A Biography. NY: Simon and Schuster, 1971.
 Victor, Adam. The Elvis Encyclopedia. Overlook Hardcover, 2008.

References

External links
[ Review at Allmusic]

1965 singles
Elvis Presley songs
Songs with music by Ben Weisman
Songs written by Sid Wayne
Songs written by Dolores Fuller
1965 songs
Songs written for films